Cottonwood is an EP by American rapper NLE Choppa. It was released on December 23, 2019, through UnitedMasters and NLE Choppa Entertainment.

The EP features two guest appearances from rappers Blueface and Meek Mill, and is supported by three singles: "Shotta Flow", its remix and "Side".

Background 
NLE Choppa went viral in January 2019, following the release of his breakthrough single "Shotta Flow", which peaked at number 36 on the US Billboard Hot 100. He first mentioned the EP in an October 2019 interview, and confirmed its release date on December 13. The title of the EP is a tribute to the street he grew up in located in Memphis.

Short film 
The EP was accompanied by a short film of the same name that was released on YouTube. Its announcement was accompanied by the release of the trailer.

Singles 
The first single, "Shotta Flow", was released on January 17, 2019 and peaked at number 36 on the US Billboard Hot 100. A remix for the track featuring Blueface, was released as the second single on June 20. Two music videos for both the original song and its remix, were subsequently released, with the latter being directed by Cole Bennett.

The third single, "Side", was released on December 13, 2019.

Track listing 
Credits adapted from Tidal.

Notes
 "Matrix" was originally present with initial production by Wheezy, and was later removed from streaming platforms due to sample clearance issues, but later reinstated with alternative production.

Charts

Certifications

References 

2019 debut EPs
NLE Choppa albums